Lieutenant General Robert Lee Bullard (January 5, 1861 – September 11, 1947) was a senior officer of the United States Army. He was involved in conflicts in the American Western Frontier, the Philippines, and World War I, where he commanded the 1st Infantry Division (nicknamed "The Big Red One") during the Battle of Cantigny while serving on the Western Front. He later was an administrator in Cuba.

Military career
A native of Alabama, Bullard attended the Agricultural and Mechanical College of Alabama, now Auburn University, and the United States Military Academy (USMA) at West Point, New York, graduated twenty-seventh in a class of thirty-nine in 1885. Among his classmates included several officers who would become future general officers, such as Beaumont B. Buck, Joseph E. Kuhn, Henry P. McCain, Robert Michie, George W. Burr, John D. Barrette, John M. Carson Jr., Robert A. Brown, Charles H. Muir, William F. Martin, Daniel B. Devore and Willard A. Holbrook.

He was promoted to first lieutenant in 1892. He served in various capacities in the Spanish–American War, and in the Philippines from 1902 to 1904. He was made lieutenant colonel in 1906. In 1907, he was special investigator for the U.S. provisional government in Cuba, and the following year was superintendent of public instruction there. In 1911, he was promoted to colonel. He attended the U.S. Army War College from 1911 to 1912.

Bullard's Indians
The 39th Volunteer Infantry was unit of United States Volunteers raised to fight in the Philippine–American War. Bullard was promoted to colonel and given command of the unit. It was nicknamed the "Bullard's Indians" due to the type of tactics the unit employed.

World War I
After the American entry into World War I, in April 1917, Bullard was quickly promoted to brigadier general (June 1917) and major general in the National Army (August 1917). He took over command of the 1st Infantry Division ("Big Red One") from William L. Sibert, holding this post from December 1917 to July 1918. The division was then serving in France as part of the American Expeditionary Forces (AEF), commanded by General John J. Pershing.

He led his division in the Battle of Cantigny (1918) and captured the village of Cantigny. It had been held by the German Eighteenth Army. It was the site of a German advance observation point and strongly fortified. This was the first sustained American offensive of the war. It was considered a success in that it expanded the American front by about a mile. General Pershing said of the attack:

The enemy reaction against our troops at Cantigny was extremely violent, and apparently he was determined at all costs to counteract the most excellent effect the American success had produced. For three days his guns of all calibers were concentrated on our new position and counter-attack succeeded counter-attack. The desperate efforts of the Germans gave the fighting at Cantigny a seeming tactical importance entirely out of proportion to the numbers involved."

Bullard was fluent in French and often served in joint U.S.–French operations.

General Pershing created the Second U.S. Army in October 1918 and appointed Bullard as its first commander with the rank of lieutenant general. At the same time he turned over command of the U.S. First Army to Lieutenant General Hunter Liggett. Pershing retained his position as commander of the AEF with authority over both of the armies.

Bullard's military actions have also been subject to criticism. In the Battle of Montfaucon, Bullard reportedly refused orders to turn the flank of the German troops with his 4th Division as he did not want to help Major General George H. Cameron, commander of V Corps, get credit for taking the German fortress at Montfaucon. Due to his alleged disobedience or deliberate misinterpretation of orders, the 79th Division, part of Cameron's V Corps, had no support to their right and suffered unnecessarily severe casualties as they performed a frontal attack on the fortress. Additionally, Bullard continued to conduct offensive operations, with full knowledge that the Armistice with Germany was due to take effect in a few hours, was criticized by Alden Brooks in his post-war account of the war, As I Saw It (1930).

For his services during the war Bullard was awarded the Army Distinguished Service Medal, the citation for which reads:

Post war

The Second Army was deactivated in April 1919 and Bullard reverted to his permanent rank of major general in June 1920. He was assigned to corps command in the much smaller post war U.S. Army. He retired from active duty in 1925 to concentrate on writing. He served as last president of the National Security League from 1925 until he disbanded it in 1947.

Bullard wrote American Soldiers Also Fought in 1936.

He died on September 11, 1947, at the age of 86. Bullard is buried at the U.S. Military Academy Post Cemetery, with his wife Ella (Reiff) Bullard (5 November 1870 to 3 March 1963).

Writing
He was author of the following books:
 Personalities and Reminiscences of the War, New York: Doubleday Page, 1925. 
 American Soldiers also Fought, New York: Longmans, Green and Co., 1936. 

Bullard also wrote several magazine articles.

Military awards
Army Distinguished Service Medal
Indian Campaign Medal
Spanish War Service Medal
Philippine Campaign Medal
Army of Cuban Pacification Medal
Mexican Border Service Medal
Victory Medal
Commander, French Legion of Honor
Commander, Belgian Order of Leopold
Commander, Italian Order of Saints Maurice and Lazarus 
French Croix de Guerre with 2 palms

Dates of rank

Source: Army Register, 1926

Bibliography

Notes
 

 Source Records of the Great War, Vol. VI, ed. Charles F. Horne, National Alumni 1923

References

External links

 The Battle of Cantigny, 1918
 
 Martin T. Olliff: Bullard, Robert Lee, in: 1914-1918-online. International Encyclopedia of the First World War.

|-

1861 births
1947 deaths
United States Army Infantry Branch personnel
United States Army War College alumni
United States Army generals
United States Army generals of World War I
United States Military Academy alumni
People from Auburn, Alabama
Burials at West Point Cemetery
Military personnel from Alabama
American military personnel of the Spanish–American War
American military personnel of the Philippine–American War
Recipients of the Distinguished Service Medal (US Army)
Auburn University alumni